The Blue Nose Marathon is a charity road marathon that has been held each spring in Halifax since 2004. 

Since its inception, abbreviated runs are also available including a youth run (2k and 4k), 5k, 10k, and  1/2 marathon, each sponsored by different local sponsors.

History 
The marathon was first held in 2004.

In 2005, despite unexpected heavy rain and strong winds, officials were able to reroute the course to avoid dangerous areas, such as a bridge crossing and flooded areas, and started the race with only a one-hour delay.

The 2020 in-person edition of the race was cancelled due to the coronavirus pandemic.

Course 

Set within the Halifax-Dartmouth city confines, the Blue Nose Marathon includes a path around Lake Banook and Lake Micmac, crossing Halifax's Macdonald Bridge, and a run through Point Pleasant Park on the south-end Halifax peninsula. All seven events start and finish at the same points, with different courses to accommodate the seven distances.

Sponsors 
Each race has its own sponsor each year, current sponsors include:
 Marathon Team Relay
 Medavie Half Marathon
 GoodLife Fitness (10k)
 Lifemark (5k)
 Doctors of Nova Scotia (youth run)

See also
 List of marathon races in North America

References

External links
 Official Website
 Full Results

Marathons in Canada
Sport in Halifax, Nova Scotia
Recurring sporting events established in 2004
2004 establishments in Nova Scotia
Tourist attractions in Halifax County, Nova Scotia
Annual sporting events in Canada
Spring (season) events in Canada